Surovikino is a town and the administrative center of Surovikinsky District in Volgograd Oblast, Russia, located at the confluence of the Chir and Don Rivers (Tsimlyansk Reservoir),  west of Volgograd, the administrative center of the oblast. Population:

History
It was founded as a settlement around the Surovikino railway station, which opened in 1900. It was granted town status in 1966.

Administrative and municipal status
Within the framework of administrative divisions, Surovikino serves as the administrative center of Surovikinsky District. As an administrative division, it is incorporated within Surovikinsky District as the town of district significance of Surovikino. As a municipal division, the town of district significance of Surovikino is incorporated within Surovikinsky Municipal District as Surovikino Urban Settlement.

References

Notes

Sources

Cities and towns in Volgograd Oblast